The cantons of Niort are administrative divisions of the Deux-Sèvres department, in western France. Since the French canton reorganisation which came into effect in March 2015, the city of Niort is subdivided into 3 cantons. Their seat is in Niort.

Population

References

Cantons of Deux-Sèvres